In optics, a Gires–Tournois etalon is a transparent plate with two reflecting surfaces, one of which has very high reflectivity, ideally unity. Due to multiple-beam interference, light incident on a Gires–Tournois etalon is (almost) completely reflected, but has an effective phase shift that depends strongly on the wavelength of the light.

The complex amplitude reflectivity of a Gires–Tournois etalon is given by

where r1 is the complex amplitude reflectivity of the first surface,

n is the index of refraction of the plate
t is the thickness of the plate
θt is the angle of refraction the light makes within the plate, and
λ is the wavelength of the light in vacuum.

Nonlinear effective phase shift 

Suppose that  is real. This indicates that all the incident energy is reflected and intensity is uniform. However, the multiple reflection causes a nonlinear phase shift . 

Define the effective phase shift  through

One obtains

For R = 0, no reflection from the first surface and the resultant nonlinear phase shift is equal to the round-trip phase change – linear response. Gires–Tournois etalon has applications for laser pulse compression and nonlinear Michelson interferometer.

Gires–Tournois etalons are closely related to Fabry–Pérot etalons. This can be seen by examining the total reflectivity of a Gires-Tournois etalon when the reflectivity of its second surface becomes smaller than 1. In these conditions the property is not observed anymore: the reflectivity starts exhibiting a resonant behavior which is characteristic of Fabry-Pérot etalons.

References
 (An interferometer useful for pulse compression of a frequency modulated light pulse.)
Gires–Tournois Interferometer in RP Photonics Encyclopedia of Laser Physics and Technology

Optical components
Interferometers